Walt Gilmore (born February 27, 1947) is a retired forward who played in the National Basketball Association (NBA). He was drafted in the second round of the 1970 NBA draft by the Portland Trail Blazers and would play one season with the team. 

Portland head coach Rolland Todd said of Gilmore, "Physical strength and speed are his assets. He does lack the background of having had to do a variety of things in college." Gilmore's agent, Leo Zinn, claimed to negotiate a $300,000 salary on behalf of his client. The Trail Blazers placed Gilmore on waivers on September 27, 1971. 

Gilmore was signed by the Cherry Hill Demons of the Eastern Basketball Association (EBA) in October 1971.

In 1972, Gilmore signed with the Kansas City Kings, but was waived before the start of the season. In November 1972, he unsuccessfully tried out the Memphis Tams of the American Basketball Association (ABA).

Gilmore was invited to preseason camp by the Philadelphia 76ers in 1973, but was one of the first players cut.

References

1946 births
Living people
American men's basketball players
Basketball players from Georgia (U.S. state)
College men's basketball players in the United States
Fort Valley State University alumni
People from Millen, Georgia
Portland Trail Blazers draft picks
Portland Trail Blazers players
Power forwards (basketball)